Rob Kelly (born 18 May 1969) is an Australian cricketer. He played three first-class matches for Western Australia in 1992/93.

References

External links
 

1969 births
Living people
Australian cricketers
Western Australia cricketers
Cricketers from Perth, Western Australia